Lithobius (Ezembius) tetraspinus, is a species of centipede of the family Lithobiidae. It was described from northwest China.

Body length is about 9.6–13.3 mm. Antennae with 19–22 articles. Cephalic plate smooth and convex. Eight to ten ocelli present on each side. Tömösváry's organ moderately smaller. Tergites smooth, without wrinkles. Sternites trapeziform and narrower posteriorly. All legs with fairly long claws. 2332, 2333 coxal pores found in males, whereas about 3343 found in females.

References 

tetraspinus
Animals described in 2018
Arthropods of Asia